Ellison is an indie rock band from Cincinnati, Ohio, signed to Carbon Copy Media. What started as a recording project quickly manifested into a full band operation. In 2005 they released their first EP titled "Indecisive and Halfhearted," and in 2006 their first full-length CD, "Say Goodnight, Sleep Alone."

History
Josh Hill, a local songwriter, attempted to follow up his 2002 acoustic release “No More Words” with a series of songs with full band arrangements. High School friend Mitch Wyatt teamed up with Josh to produce a three song demo that would form the basis of what was then known as The Josh Hill Band. After playing a few shows with stand-in musicians, the two quickly realized the potential of a collective band. Following the recruitment of bassist, JD Carlson, the three decided on a more cohesive band name—The Josh Hill Band became known as Ellison. In June 2005 the trio stumbled across the band's newest member, Ian Bolender.

Their 2005 EP ("Indecisive and Halfhearted") and constant regional live shows caught the attention of J.T. Woodruff, lead singer of the gold record-selling band Hawthorne Heights. Woodruff launched his own record label, Carbon Copy Media, and in early 2006 signed Ellison as the first band to his fledgling label.

Say Goodnight, Sleep Alone
Ellison's first full-length album, "Say Goodnight, Sleep Alone" was released on August 22, 2006. The album is currently being distributed by Victory Records.

Members
Josh Hill – vocals, guitar, synth
Ian Bolender – guitar
Kent Landvatter – bass, backing vocals
Stefan Wright – drums, percussion

Past members
Mitch Wyatt – drums, percussion, backing vocals
J.D. Carlson – bass, backing vocals

Discography

Studio albums

EPs

Compilations
Punk the Clock, Volume III: Property of a Gentleman (2007)

References

External links
 Official website
 Ellison's profile at MySpace
 Ellison's profile at PureVolume
 Ellison E Team (Official street team)
 Carbon Copy Media

Indie rock musical groups from Ohio
Musical groups from Cincinnati